Cold Summer is the debut studio album from the hip hop trio U.S.D.A. It was released May 22, 2007, on Jeezy's Corporate Thugz Entertainment label, which is distributed by Def Jam. The album debuted at No. 4 on the Billboard 200 with approximately 95,000 copies sold in its first week released.

Background 
In an interview with MTV, Jeezy explained why he chose not to release a regular studio album to showcase his crew.

Singles 
 The lead single is "White Girl", produced by Drumma Boy.
 The second single is "Corporate Thuggin'".

Track listing

Charts

Weekly charts

Year-end charts

References 

2007 compilation albums
2007 debut albums
U.S.D.A (group) albums
Albums produced by Drumma Boy
Def Jam Recordings compilation albums